is a compilation of all five Darkstalkers arcade games that were released in Japan only for the PlayStation 2 in 2005. Darkstalkers Collection was also released together with Hyper Street Fighter II: The Anniversary Edition as part of one of the Value Pack compilations for the PS2 in 2008 in Japan.

Gameplay
This compilation features the original arcade versions of the games, as well as hidden arranged versions of the three Vampire Savior games, which introduce a corrupt dhampir version of Donovan, Dee, as a secret playable character with his own storyline.

Contents

Reception
IGN called it "one of the finest compilations ever" and a "true, wait-free arcade perfection". Siliconera stated that "the fighting engine has aged considerably. It's really designed for people who love the series and Capcom's more traditional 2D fighters".

References

2005 video games
Darkstalkers video games
Japan-exclusive video games
PlayStation 2-only games
Capcom video game compilations
Trilogies
Video games developed in Japan
PlayStation 2 games

Multiplayer and single-player video games